was the 3rd daimyō of Aizu Domain in Mutsu Province, Japan (modern-day Fukushima Prefecture). His courtesy title was Sankonoe-gon-chū-shō and Jijū, and his Court rank was Senior Fourth Rank, Lower Grade.

Biography
Matsudaira Masakata was the sixth son of Hoshina Masayuki and became daimyō in 1681 on the retirement of his elder brother. His courtesy title was Bungo-no-kami, which was increased to Sankonoe-gon-shō-shō in 1687. Initially, his name was Hoshina Masanobu (保科正信), but in 1696 he was permitted to change his name to Matsudaira Masakata, in recognition of the clan's status of being a cadet branch of the Tokugawa clan. His courtesy title was promoted to Sankonoe-gon-chū-shō in 1712. He was married to a daughter of Abe Masatake of Oshi Domain, and had nine sons and four daughters. He ruled to his death in 1731.

See also
Hoshina clan

References 
 "Aizu-han" on Edo 300 HTML ) 
Noguchi Shin'ichi (2005). Aizu-han. Tokyo: Gendai shokan.

Shinpan daimyo
1669 births
1731 deaths
Aizu-Matsudaira clan
People of Edo-period Japan